Melenkovsky District is an administrative and municipal district (raion), one of the sixteen in Vladimir Oblast, Russia. It is located in the southeast of the oblast. Its administrative center is the town of Melenki. Population:   41,125 (2002 Census);  The population of Melenki accounts for 41.0% of the district's total population.

References

Notes

Sources

Districts of Vladimir Oblast